The William B. and Julia Washington House, at 112 N. 3rd St. in Leoti in Wichita County, Kansas.  It was completed in 1892.  It was listed on the National Register of Historic Places in 2014.

It was deemed to be a "late Victorian-era Queen Anne-style house with Free Classic elements" and "one of the best remaining examples of this style in Wichita County."

It is a museum of the Wichita County Historical Society.

It is associated with the Museum of the Great Plains (Wichita County, Kansas).

References

Houses on the National Register of Historic Places in Kansas
Houses completed in 1892
Queen Anne architecture in Kansas
Wichita County, Kansas
National Register of Historic Places in Wichita County, Kansas
Museums in Wichita, Kansas
Historical societies in Kansas